Take Back the Night may refer to:
Take Back the Night (organization), an anti-violence organization
"Take Back the Night" (song), a 2013 song by Justin Timberlake
"Take Back the Night", a 2013 song by TryHardNinja in collaboration with Jordan Maron
Take Back the Night, a 1980 feminist book edited by Laura Lederer